Poa drummondiana is a perennial herb in the Poaceae family.

Distribution
Poa drummondiana (common name - Knotted poa) is found in Western Australia, South Australia and Victoria.

Taxonomy
It was first described in 1843 by Nees von Esenbeck, from a specimen collected by James Drummond on the Swan River.

References

External links 

 Poa drummondiana occurrence data from the Australasian Virtual Herbarium

drummondiana
Flora of Western Australia
Taxa named by Christian Gottfried Daniel Nees von Esenbeck
Eudicots of Western Australia
Plants described in 1843
Flora of South Australia
Flora of Victoria (Australia)